Pennsylvania Governor's Office of General Counsel is an executive-level agency in Pennsylvania providing legal services to all executive agencies, boards, and commissions and select independent agencies of the Government of Pennsylvania. It is governed by the Commonwealth Attorneys Act of 1980.

See also
 List of Pennsylvania state agencies

References

External links
Pennsylvania Governor's Office of General Counsel

 
State agencies of Pennsylvania